Julian Minor Quarles (September 25, 1848 – November 18, 1929) was a lawyer, judge and United States Representative  from Virginia to the 56th Congress.

Biography
He was born near Ruther Glen, Virginia to Peter and Mary E. (née Waddy) Quarles.  Peter Quarles had served as a soldier in the War of 1812.

Quarles received his early education from Pine Hill Academy and Aspen Hill Academy.  He graduated from the University of Virginia.  He taught school for several years before completing his degree in law at the University of Virginia in 1874.  He practiced law in Staunton, Virginia, and served as county court judge for Augusta County, Virginia from 1880 to 1883. He also served on the board of directors of Mary Baldwin College.

Quarles was elected as a Democrat to the United States House of Representatives from Virginia in 1898 and served from March 4, 1899 to March 3, 1901. He was a delegate to the Virginia Constitutional Convention of 1901-1902, and voted to proclaim the constitution without referendum. He died in Staunton, Virginia.

In 1876 Quarles married Cornelia Stout.  She died in 1903 and in 1908 Quarles married Cornelia Taylor.  He and his second wife were the parents of two daughters and a son.

Sources
Citations

Bibliography

New River Notes bio of Quarles

Delegates to Virginia Constitutional Convention of 1901
20th-century American politicians
Virginia lawyers
Virginia state court judges
1848 births
1929 deaths
University of Virginia alumni
People from Caroline County, Virginia
Democratic Party members of the United States House of Representatives from Virginia
Politicians from Staunton, Virginia
20th-century American judges
19th-century American lawyers
20th-century American lawyers